Garibaldo Nizzola (3 December 1927 – 26 December 2012) was an Italian freestyle wrestler. He competed at the 1948, 1952, 1956 and 1960 Olympics in the lightweight division with the best achievement of fourth place in 1948. In 1951 he won silver medals at the world championships and Mediterranean Games. His father, Marcello Nizzola, won a silver medal in wrestling at the 1932 Olympics. He died on 26 December 2012 at the age of 85.

References

External links
 

1927 births
2012 deaths
Olympic wrestlers of Italy
Wrestlers at the 1948 Summer Olympics
Wrestlers at the 1952 Summer Olympics
Wrestlers at the 1956 Summer Olympics
Wrestlers at the 1960 Summer Olympics
Italian male sport wrestlers
World Wrestling Championships medalists
Mediterranean Games silver medalists for Italy
Wrestlers at the 1951 Mediterranean Games
Mediterranean Games medalists in wrestling
20th-century Italian people
21st-century Italian people